Guilherme Milhomem Gusmão (born 22 October 1988), simply known Guilherme, is a Brazilian footballer who plays for an attacking midfielder for São Joseense.

Club career

Cruzeiro
He made a big impression this at Cruzeiro, who were comfortably top scorers in the Campeonato Brasileiro 2007. Guilherme played as a supporting striker, where he showed excellent vision for the killer pass.

2008 in his second season, he was fifth top scorer with 28 goals.

Dynamo Kyiv
In February 2009, Dynamo Kyiv signed Guilherme on a five-year deal for a reported €5 million fee with Kléber moving in the opposite direction. Guilherme made his debut for Dynamo on 19 April 2009 as a second-half substitute in a 2–1 loss against Kryvbas Kryvyi Rih. He went on to score a hat-trick in his first game as a starter in the Ukrainian Premier League on 16 May 2009 against Karpaty Lviv at Ukraina Stadium. Dynamo won the game 4–1, with Guilherme also recording an assist.

Loan to CSKA Moscow
On 29 August 2009, the day Dynamo Kyiv re-signed Andriy Shevchenko, Guilherme joined CSKA Moscow in a one-year loan deal worth $1 million. CSKA also received a right of first refusal on the player. He scored two goals in his first Russian Premier League game against FC Krylia Sovetov Samara. He returned to Dynamo Kyiv when his loan expired in the summer of 2010 and CSKA refused to pay the transfer fee to buy him out from Dynamo.

Atlético Mineiro
In March 2011, Atlético Mineiro signed Guilherme on a four-year deal for a reported €5 million. Guilherme made his debut for Galo on 21 May 2011 in a 3–0 win against Atlético Paranaense.

Antalyaspor
In August 2015, Guilherme rescinded his contract with Atlético and signed with Turkish club Antalyaspor.

Corinthians
On 19 January 2016, Guilherme returned to Brazil and signed with current national champions Corinthians.

In May, he was loaned to Fluminense until the end of the season.

Career statistics

Honours
Cruzeiro
Campeonato Mineiro: 2008

Dynamo Kyiv
Ukrainian Premier League: 2008–09
Ukrainian Super Cup: 2009

CSKA Moscow
Russian Cup: 2010–11

Atlético Mineiro
Campeonato Mineiro: 2012, 2013, 2015
Copa Libertadores: 2013
Recopa Sudamericana: 2014
Copa do Brasil: 2014

References

External links

 Guardian Stats Centre

1988 births
People from Imperatriz
Sportspeople from Maranhão
Living people
Brazilian footballers
Association football midfielders
Cruzeiro Esporte Clube players
FC Dynamo Kyiv players
PFC CSKA Moscow players
Clube Atlético Mineiro players
Antalyaspor footballers
Sport Club Corinthians Paulista players
Club Athletico Paranaense players
Esporte Clube Bahia players
Fluminense FC players
América Futebol Clube (MG) players
Brusque Futebol Clube players
Copa Libertadores-winning players
Campeonato Brasileiro Série A players
Campeonato Brasileiro Série B players
Campeonato Paranaense players
Ukrainian Premier League players
Russian Premier League players
Süper Lig players
Brazilian expatriate footballers
Expatriate footballers in Ukraine
Brazilian expatriate sportspeople in Ukraine
Expatriate footballers in Russia
Brazilian expatriate sportspeople in Russia
Expatriate footballers in Turkey
Brazilian expatriate sportspeople in Turkey